Reinhard Wolschina (born 31 August 1952) is a German composer.

Life 
From 1982 to 1984, he was a master student with Günter Kochan at the Academy of Arts, Berlin.

In 1992, he became professor for composition and music theory in Weimar. There, he was the director of the Studio for Neue Musik. His students included Johannes K. Hildebrandt, Hubert Hoche, Peter Helmut Lang and Thomas Stöß. He has worked among others with Roswitha Trexler and Giora Feidman. Wolschina is a member of the trio "pianOVo".

Awards 
 1975/76 and 1976/77 Mendelssohn Scholarship of the Ministry of Culture of the GDR
 1985 Hanns Eisler Prize of the radio of the GDR.
 1988 Hanns Eisler Prize of the radio of the GDR.
 1996 Interpretation Prize of the Johann Wenzel Stamitz Prize of the Künstlergilde Esslingen

Work

Orchestra and chamber orchestra (from 8 players) 
 Sinata for Orchestra (1970) - In memory of Béla Bartók, 18'
 Contrast for String orchestra (1972), 15'
 Concert for oboe, strings and percussion (1974), 14'
 Three dialogues for horn and 15 solo strings (1975), 16', publisher: DVfM/BH
 Canto appassionata for orchestra (1977) - In memory of L. Janáček, 13', publisher: EMV
 Drei novellen for string trio and orchestra (1980), 17', publisher: DVfM
 Four Aphorisms for string orchestra (1981). 10', publisher: DVfM
 Wandlungen - Music for string orchestra (1985), 17', publisher: DVfM
 Klangspiele I for flute and 18 instruments (1987), 17', publisher: DVfM
 Concert for paino and orchestra (1988), 16', publisher: DVfM
 Klangspiele II for viola and 14 instruments (1989), 16', publisher: DVfM
 Klangspiele III for marimba, vibraphone and string orchestra (1990), 11', publisher: DVfM
 Klangspiele IV for 2 pianos 8 hands and 4 percussionists (1993), 18', publisher: DVfM
 Zimra for clarinet, string orchestra, harp, piano and percussion (1995) - for Giora Feidman, 16', publisher: EMV
 Double concert for double bass, marimbaphone, 18 winds and 2 harps (1995), 20', publisher: EMV
 8 Bagatellenn for 8 instruments (with epilogue for soprano and 8 instruments) - in memoriam Hanns Eisler- (1998), 20', publisher: EMV
 Regenbogenmusik for violoncello and small orchestra (2000), 12', EMV

Chamber music

Solo 
 Sonata for piano (1971), 10'
 Puccini study for oboe (1977), 3', publisher: DVfM/BH
 Monologue for viola sola (1983), 6', publisher: EMV
 2 Inventions for oboe (1985), 5', publisher: DVfM/BH
 Waldszenen 1986 for double bass solo (1986), 8 ', publisher: DVfM/BH
 Preludium for horn solo (1987), 4', H.H.-Musikverlag, RW 011
 Eisle Variation for piano (1988), 6', Publisher: VNM
 Choral vision for organ (1991), 7', publisher: Keturi
 Windspiele - 3 Fantasiestücke for guitar (1996), 10', publisher: CHV
 Windspiele for piano (1997), 11', H.H.-Musikverlag, RW 001

Duo 
 Cantoa Ppassionato for viola and piano - in memory of L. Janáček (1976), 13', publisher: EMV
 Nocturne for flute and guitar (1985) or basset horn and guitar (1995), 6', publisher: Keturi
 Choral-Mrtamorphosen for organ and piano (1992), 10', publisher: EMV
 Playmobil - 3 little pieces to discover- for 2 bassoons (1994), 8', publisher: EMV
 Duodramma for oboe instruments (baritonob. /Ob.+ EH) and violoncello - in memoriam W. Lutoslawski (1995), 9', publisher: Keturi
 Kandinsky-musik for flute instruments (bass flute, flute, piccolo) and piano (1996), 10', publisher: Keturi
 Traumbilder - 10 changes of a thought by Robert Schumann- for violoncello and piano (1999), 15', H.H.-Musikverlag, RW 002
 Traumbilder for alto saxophone and piano (2000), 16', H.H.-Musikverlag, RW 005
 Traumbilder for clarinet and piano (2002), 16', H.H.-Musikverlag, RW 003
 Slapsticks for 2 percussionists and percussion tape (2001), 10', publisher: VNM
 Fourteen Variations ... on the beginning of the soprano aria "Last hour ..." from J. S. Bach's cantata BWV 31 for bass clarinet and violoncello (2OO2), 15', publisher: EMV
 Klangwege for violin and accordion (2003), 10', H.H.-Musikverlag, RW 006
 Impulse for guitar and piano (2005), 7', H.H.-Musikverlag, RW 012
 Regenbogenmusik for violoncello and piano (2011), 12', EMV

Trio 
 pezzo capriccioso per trio (t974), 11', Verlag: DVfM/BH
 Vision-Action for oboe, violoncello and double bass (1982), 10', H.H.-Musikverlag, RW 009
 Fantasie for 3 percussionists (1983), 6', publisher: EMV
 Klangszeichen for violin, guitar and accordion (1987), 9', publisher: PMV
 7 Inventions for 3 flutes (1992), 15', publisher: Keturi
 Epitaph for J.C. for 2 flutes and harp (2003), 6', H.H.-Musikverlag, RW 007
 Béla Bartók: Three pieces from Mikrokosmos in a transcription for flute(s), oboe(s) and piano (2OO1), 7'

Quartet 
 Cocteau-Reflexionen for 2 pianos for 8 hands (1982), 12', publisher: EMV
 Preludium and variations for string quartet (1984), 11', publisher: DVfM/BH
 Moments of Silence - 5 postludes for JSB for basset horn and string trio (2000), 14', H.H.-Musikverlag, RW 004
 Music for four flutes: I. "Breathing silence", II. "Getting into motion" (2004), 8', H.H.-Musikverlag, RW 010

Quintet 
 5 Caprichos (after Goya) für Bläserquartett und Schlagzeug (1973), 18', Verlag: DVfM/BH
 4 Aphorismen for string quartet (1981), 10', Verlag: Keturi
 Seismogram 4 Szenen für Fl., Klar., Vi., Vc und Kontrabass mit 5 Holzblocks und 5 Claves (1994), 16', Verlag: EMV
 Seebilder – Metamorphosen for Bläserquintett (2006), 13', H.H.-Musikverlag, RW 013 (in Vorbereitung)

Sextet 
 Drei Stücke for 6 violas (1984), 10', publisher: EMV
 Perpetuum mobile per JSB - Fantasy on the choral Wie schön leuchtet der Morgenstern for 6 clarinets (2004), 7', publisher: EMV

Vokal music 
 Martial-Epigramme for tenor solo (high bar.), mixed choir, 12 winds, piano and percussion (1981), 15'. Publisher: DVfM
 Vier Lieder for baritone and piano (texts by Eva Strittmatter) (1983), 9', publisher: DVfM/BH
 Kosmisch Zeichen for baritone, string orchestra and percussion (after poems by Hanns Cibulka) (1986), 16', publisher: DVfM
 Aenas-Song for baritone and string quartet or string orchestra (1991), 11', publisher: Keturi

Transcriptions 
 Contrabab Concert in F sharp minor by G. Bottesini (1821-1889) in a new instrumentation for double bass and small orchestra (1979), 22', Publisher: Fr. Hofmeister, Leipzig
 Lemminkäinen Suite op. 22/2 by J. Sibelius (1865-1957) in a transcription for English horn, violoncello and piano (1994), 10', publisher: DVfM Leipzig
 La lugubre gondola by Franz Liszt (1811-1886) for basset horn, harp, marimba, vibraphone and tubular bells (2003), 8', H.H.-Musikverlag, RW 008
 Three pieces from Mikrokosmos by Béla Bartók (1881-1945) in a transcription for flute(s), oboe(s) and piano (2001), 7', private

Recordings 
 2002: Trio 'pianOVo' - In concert
 2006: Chris Bilobram & Reinhard Wolschina - Soundways
 2012: Reinhard Wolschina - Portrait

References

External links 
 
 
 Reinhard Wolschina at 

20th-century German composers
20th-century classical composers
Academic staff of the Hochschule für Musik Franz Liszt, Weimar
1952 births
Living people
Musicians from Leipzig